Pseudophlyctenodes hantkeni is an extinct species of crab in the monotypic genus Pseudophlyctenodes, in the family Xanthidae. It is known from the Eocene of Hungary and Sicily.

References

Xanthoidea
Eocene crustaceans
Monotypic arthropod genera
Prehistoric life of Europe